The Parabacteroides-1 RNA motif is a conserved RNA structure that was discovered by bioinformatics.
Energetically stable tetraloops often occur in this motif.
Parabacteroides-1 motif RNAs are found in Parabacteroides.

Parabacteroides-1 RNAs likely function in trans as small RNAs, and are immediately followed by a predicted Rho-independent transcription terminator hairpin.  Based on the protein-coding genes that are nearby to Parabacteroides-1 RNAs, it is likely that at least some of these RNAs are located in prophage region.

References

Non-coding RNA